Mariam Danelia (born 24 January 1994) is a Georgian chess player who holds the FIDE title of Woman International Master (WIM, 2008).

Biography
She learned to play chess at the age of five. Danelia repeatedly represented Georgia at the European Youth Chess Championships and World Youth Chess Championships in different age groups, where she won three medals: two gold (in 2006, at the World Youth Chess Championship in the U12 girls age group and in 2010, at the European Youth Chess Championship in the U16 girls age group) and silver (in 2006, at the European Youth Chess Championship in the U10 girls age group).

In 2008, she was awarded the FIDE Woman International Master (WIM) title.

In 2009, she won Georgian Youth Chess Championship in the U16 girls age group. In 2010, she won silver medal in Georgian Youth Chess Championship in the U16 girls age group.

Since 2013, Danelia has been studying at University of Texas at Dallas and has been participating in chess tournaments in United States.

References

External links
 
 
 
 

1994 births
Living people
Female chess players from Georgia (country)
Chess Woman International Masters